Proctoporus cephalolineatus is a species of lizard in the family Gymnophthalmidae. It is endemic to Venezuela.

References

Proctoporus
Reptiles of Venezuela
Endemic fauna of Venezuela
Reptiles described in 1995
Taxa named by Juan Elías García-Pérez
Taxa named by Enrique Elías Yustiz